Aaron Lohr (born April 7, 1976) is an American actor.

Early life and education
Lohr was born in Crofton, Maryland. He is a graduate of UCLA, where he  majored in theater.

Film and television career 
Lohr portrayed the Dancing Boy in Deniece Williams' music video for the song "Let's Hear It for the Boy". He is also in the British television advertisement for Carlsberg Beer. Lohr has also appeared in many Sister, Sister episodes, better known as Marlon in his later appearances in the show.

Lohr became a recognizable player of the Disney Studios stable, appearing in many of their films, including The Mighty Ducks series and Newsies. He provided the singing voice for Max Goof in A Goofy Movie (filling in for Jason Marsden).  In 2000, he starred as Micky Dolenz in the VH1 television film Daydream Believers: The Monkees' Story.

He appeared in the 2005 film adaptation of the Tony and Pulitzer Prize winning Broadway musical Rent, directed by Chris Columbus. Lohr played the character Steve and sang vocals for the songs Will I and Life Support on the first disc of the soundtrack for the film. He starred in various roles in Michael John LaChiusa's See What I Wanna See at the New York Public Theater, opposite actress/singer Idina Menzel. Independent film releases include Henry Bean's Noise, Jim Koya Jones' taut psychological thriller The Wreck, and Manslaughter produced by Jim Koya Jones.

More recent work has included many leading roles in New York theater productions. He performed as Matt in the Off-Broadway production of Bare: A Pop Opera
in 2004. He has appeared in several productions at the Public Theater. His inaugural performance there was in George Wolfe's Radiant Baby in 2003. This led to his starring role in See What I Want To See by Michael John LaChuisa. Lohr also starred in the political drama In Darfur both at the NY Public and Delacorte Theater.

Personal life 

In August 2015, Lohr and actress Idina Menzel bought a home located in Encino, Los Angeles. Menzel announced on September 23, 2016, via her Twitter account, that she and Lohr were engaged. Menzel announced their marriage via Twitter on September 25, 2017. They were married over the weekend of September 22, 2017. Lohr is the stepfather to Menzel’s son from her marriage with Taye Diggs.

Filmography

Film

Television

References

External links

1976 births
20th-century American male actors
21st-century American male actors
American male child actors
American male film actors
American male musical theatre actors
American male television actors
American male video game actors
American male voice actors
John Jay College of Criminal Justice alumni
Living people
Male actors from Los Angeles
UCLA Film School alumni